Málaga Centro-Alameda is an underground railway station opened in 1976 in the Spanish city of Málaga, Andalucia. It serves as the city centre terminus for Cercanías Málaga lines C-1 to Fuengirola and C-2 to Álora. In 2020 it will be connected to Málaga Metro via the Guadalmedina station.

History

The station opened in 1976 along with the C-1 Cercanías line to Fuengirola. From 2007 to 2010, the station closed for a €4.4 million renovation which included new entrances at street level, and to enable C-2 services from Álora to access the station via a tunnel leading to underground platforms at Málaga María Zambrano station.

Services 

Centro-Alameda is served by both Cercanías Málaga commuter rail lines, with a frequency of every 10–20 minutes.

References

Railway stations in Andalusia
Buildings and structures in Málaga
Railway stations located underground in Spain
Railway stations in Spain opened in 1976